Robert M. Schertzer  (born 4 February 1962) is a Canadian ophthalmologist with a subspecialty in glaucoma treatment. He currently serves as the Clinical Associate Professor of Ophthalmology and Visual Sciences at the University of British Columbia.

Education
Schertzer graduated with a BSc in Physiology from McGill University in 1983 and an MD from the Dalhousie University in 1988. He completed his Ophthalmology residency at McGill University in 1994 and obtained a glaucoma fellowship at Dartmouth in 1996. He graduated with an MEd in Adult Education at the University of British Columbia in 2006.

Career 
Schertzer is a Clinical Associate Professor of Ophthalmology and Visual Sciences at the University of British Columbia. He had previously served as Clinical Assistant Professor at the University of Michigan in 1996-1999, University of British Columbia in 1999-2007 and 2008-2013 and Geisel School of Medicine in 2013-2018.

Schertzer serves as a member on the Health Data Coalition Board of Directors.

Schertzer became a Fellow of The Royal College of Surgeons of Canada in 1994.

Awards 
2016 and 2017 - American Academy of Ophthalmology Achievement Award.

Publications 

 Shimizu S, Lichter PR, Johnson AT, Zhou Z, Higashi M, Gottfredsdottir M, Othman M, Moroi SE, Schertzer RM, Clarke MS, Schwartz AL, Downs CA, Vollrath D, Richards JE: Age-dependent prevalence of mutations at the GLC1A locus in primary open-angle glaucoma. Am. J. Ophthalmol. 130:165-177, 2000.
LaRoche GR, McIntyre L, Schertzer RM: Epidemiology of severe eye injuries in childhood. Ophthalmology 95(12):1603-1607, 1988.
Moroi SE, Gottfredsdottir MS, Schteingart MT, Elner SG, Lee CM, Schertzer RM, Abrams GW, Johnson MW: Cystoid Macular Edema Associated with Latanoprost Therapy in a Case Series of Patients with Glaucoma and Ocular Hypertension. Ophthalmology 106(5):1024-1029, 1999.
Canadian Ophthalmological Society Glaucoma Clinical Practice Guideline Expert Committee; Canadian Ophthalmological Society. Canadian Ophthalmological Society evidence-based clinical practice guidelines for the management of glaucoma in the adult eye. 2009 Aug;44(4):477. PMID 19492005.
Sugar A, Schertzer RM: The Clinical Course of Phacoemulsification Wound Burns. J Cataract Refract Surg 25(5):688-692, 1999.
Eibschitz-Tsimhoni M, Schertzer RM, Musch DC, Moroi SE. Incidence and management of encapsulated cysts following Ahmed glaucoma valve insertion. J Glaucoma. 2005 Aug;14(4):276-9.
Isbister CM, Schertzer RM, Mackenzie PJ: Comparison of Silicone and Polypropylene Ahmed Glaucoma Valves: Two year follow-up. Canadian Journal Ophthalmology 42: 227-232, April 2007.

External links 
Scopus Author ID

References

1962 births
Living people
Canadian ophthalmologists
Physicians from Montreal
Academic staff of the University of British Columbia Faculty of Medicine
McGill University alumni
Dalhousie University alumni
University of British Columbia alumni
University of Michigan faculty
Geisel School of Medicine faculty
Fellows of the Royal College of Physicians and Surgeons of Canada
20th-century Canadian physicians
21st-century Canadian physicians